Star Trap is a 1988 UK television film with a screenplay written by Tony Bicât that was commissioned for London Weekend Television. Also directed by Bicât, the film was made over a period of six weeks; mainly in the Cotswolds. The final climax of the movie, set during a production of Shakespeare's Richard III, was filmed inside the Cochrane Theatre in London which was made to resemble the Stratford Memorial Theatre for the movie.  

Star Trap is a detective story featuring two rivals investigating murder that involves the occult. The film stars Daniel Flynn as the Detective, Nicky Henson as Adam Blunt, Philip Sayer as Basil Underwood, Jeananne Crowley as Lady Diana Fortesque, John Pennington as Sir John Fortesque, Frances Tomelty as Hermione Bradstreet, Lucy Benjamin as Nancy, Hugh Simon as Cradock, Allan Surtees as Dr Gregson, Sandra Yue as the Old Woman, Bryan Matheson as the Judge, Arthur Blake as Jim and Sharon Holm as Sue.

References

External links
Star Trap at IMDB

1988 television films
British television films
1988 films